Tizi N'Tacheddirt is a small village high up (2314 m) in the Atlas Mountains of Morocco. It is the highest settlement in the Rhirhaia valley, about 4 km further up from Ikkiss.

It has a population of about 200 to 300 people. Access is limited to a steep and winding footpath.

External links

Mountain villages in Morocco
Populated places in Al Haouz Province